The Port Orchard Independent is a weekly newspaper serving Port Orchard and southern Kitsap County, Washington. It is owned by Sound Publishing, an imprint of Black Press, and is part of the Kitsap News Group's weekly publications.

History 
In 1890, there were two local newspapers serving Port Orchard: the Broad Ax and the Kitsap County Pioneer. Walter L. Wheeler purchased the two papers and merged them under the name the Sidney Independent, which was later renamed the Port Orchard Independent. Wheeler remained the owner and publisher of the paper until he sold it to W. L. Thompson & E. E. Brooks in 1899.

Awards 
The Port Orchard Independent has won multiple awards from the Washington Newspaper Publishers Association for its news, advertising, special sections and photography.

References

External links 

Kitsap County, Washington
Newspapers published in Washington (state)
Newspapers established in 1890
1890 establishments in Washington (state)
Weekly newspapers published in the United States